Mrzli Vrh is a dispersed settlement in the hills northeast of Spodnja Idrija in the Municipality of Idrija in the traditional Inner Carniola region of Slovenia.

References

External links

Mrzli Vrh on Geopedia

Populated places in the Municipality of Idrija